Clyde Edward Lovellette (September 7, 1929 – March 9, 2016) was an American professional basketball player. Lovellette was inducted into the Naismith Memorial Basketball Hall of Fame in 1988. He was the first basketball player in history to play on an NCAA championship team, Olympics gold medal basketball team, and NBA championship squad.

Basketball career

Lovellette fostered the trend of tall, physical and high-scoring centers. A two-time All-State performer at Garfield High School in Terre Haute, Indiana. As a high school junior (1946-47), Lovellette's previously undefeated high school team in Terre Haute, Indiana lost in the Indiana state championship finals to Shelbyville, Indiana led by Bill Garrett. The six-foot-nine Lovellette later attended the University of Kansas where he became a member of the Sigma Chi fraternity.

While at the University of Kansas he led Jayhawks to the 1952 NCAA title, capturing MVP honors and scoring a then-NCAA-record 141 points. A two-time first-team All-American at Kansas, Clyde led the Big Seven in scoring in each of his three seasons. Playing for Basketball Hall of Fame coach Forrest "Phog" Allen, Lovellette led the nation in scoring his senior year (1952, 28.4 ppg) and was named the Helms College Player of the Year.

Lovellette and basketball legend Dean Smith were teammates at Kansas. He is still the only college player to lead the nation in scoring and win the NCAA title in the same year. Lovellette's dominance in the paint landed him a place on the 1952 Summer Olympics gold medal team in Helsinki, Finland and he was the team's dominating player and leading scorer.

Lovelette was the 1st Round pick (#9) of the Minneapolis Lakers in the 1952 NBA draft.

Following graduation, Lovelette played in 1951-1952 and 1952-1953 seasons for the Bartlesville Phillips 66ers. 

At the pro level, Clyde became one of the first big men to move outside and utilize the one-handed set shot that extended his shooting range and offensive repertoire. This tactic enabled him to play either the small forward, power forward or center positions, forcing the opposition's big man to play out of position. In 1957, Lovelette led Minneapolis to the NBA Western Division Finals by averaging a playoffs career best 24.2 points along with 9.4 rebounds per game. Despite performing big, including scoring 33 points and grabbing 9 rebounds in Game 2 of the series, Lovelette and the Lakers were eliminated by Bob Pettit and the St. Louis Hawks.

That offseason, Lovelette was traded to Cincinnati for 5 players, including Hot Rod Hundley and Monk Meineke. A year later he was traded again, this time to St. Louis for Wayne Embry, among others.

In 704 NBA games with the Minneapolis Lakers, Cincinnati Royals, St. Louis Hawks and Boston Celtics, Lovellette scored 11,947 points (17.0 ppg) and grabbed 6,663 rebounds (9.3 rpg). Selected to play in four NBA All-Star Games, Lovellette was an integral component of championships in Minneapolis (1954) and Boston (1963, 1964).

In 1972–73, he coached the Decatur Bullets of the Continental Basketball Association for one season before the team folded. He was paid $150 per game.

Honors
Lovellette is one of only eight players in history to win an NCAA championship, an NBA championship, and an Olympic gold medal. He also became the first player to win a championship with both the Boston Celtics and Minneapolis/Los Angeles Lakers. Rajon Rondo became the second player ever in 2020.

Lovellette was inducted into the Indiana Basketball Hall of Fame in 1982.

Lovelette had his #16 jersey retired by the University of Kansas.

Lovelette was inducted into the Naismith Memorial Basketball Hall of Fame in 1988. As of 2018, Lovellette is the only player from the 1952 NBA draft to make the Naismith Memorial Basketball Hall of Fame.

He was featured in the 1950s All-Star roster on NBA Live 2007.

Personal

Clyde married Sally Wheeler while attending Kansas University. They had three daughters, Cynthia, Linda, and Cherie  

After retiring from his career as a professional basketball player he was a elected as Sheriff of Vigo County, Indiana. He owed a small farm, raising and showing cattle, and engaged in various business activities, and eventually getting his Masters Degree.

At Whites Residential Services, a faith-based school in Wabash County, Indiana for at-risk teenagers, he served for 20 years and was successful in providing a positive influence on their lives. 

A summer residence in the UP of Michigan ultimately became a full time residence in the small town of Munising in the Upper Peninsula of Michigan where he served as the Varsity Basketball Assistant Coach and on the Munising City Council.

Clyde came back to Indiana as a full time resident where he eventually passed alway surrounded by his family.  

Lovellette died from cancer in North Manchester, Indiana at the age of 86.

NBA career statistics

Regular season

Playoffs

References

External links
Indiana Basketball Hall of Fame bio
University of Kansas Men's Basketball
Basketball-reference.com: Clyde Lovellette stats
 
 

1929 births
2016 deaths
All-American college men's basketball players
American men's basketball coaches
American men's basketball players
Basketball players at the 1952 Summer Olympics
Basketball players from Indiana
Boston Celtics players
Centers (basketball)
Cincinnati Royals players
Kansas Jayhawks men's basketball players
Medalists at the 1952 Summer Olympics
Minneapolis Lakers draft picks
Minneapolis Lakers players
Naismith Memorial Basketball Hall of Fame inductees
National Basketball Association All-Stars
National Collegiate Basketball Hall of Fame inductees
Olympic gold medalists for the United States in basketball
People from Petersburg, Indiana
Phillips 66ers players
Power forwards (basketball)
Sportspeople from Terre Haute, Indiana
St. Louis Hawks players
United States men's national basketball team players